The James Geddes Engine Company No. 6, at 629 2nd Ave., S., in Nashville, Tennessee, was built in 1884–85. It was listed on the National Register of Historic Places in 1978.

It is a two-story red brick building with terra cotta, stone, and metal details.

It is named for James Geddes, a Scottish-born civil engineer who long worked for the Louisville and Nashville Railroad and was a "prominent Nashvillian".

References

Fire stations on the National Register of Historic Places in Tennessee
National Register of Historic Places in Davidson County, Tennessee
Buildings and structures completed in 1885